The Prentiss-Payson House is a historic house in Arlington, Massachusetts.  This -story clapboarded wood-frame house was built in 1856 for two women named Prentiss and Payson.  Its massing and some of its styling is Italianate, but the front door surround, with sidelight and transom windows, pilasters, and triangular pediment, is distinctly Greek Revival in character.  A later resident was Prentiss Payson, organist at a local church and a music teacher.

The house was listed on the National Register of Historic Places in 1985.

See also
National Register of Historic Places listings in Arlington, Massachusetts

References

Houses on the National Register of Historic Places in Arlington, Massachusetts
Houses completed in 1856
Houses in Arlington, Massachusetts
Greek Revival architecture in Massachusetts